Billy Leahy (born 7 March 1911) is  a former Australian rules footballer who played with Footscray in the Victorian Football League (VFL).

Notes

External links 
		

1911 births
Year of death missing
Australian rules footballers from Victoria (Australia)
Western Bulldogs players
Coburg Football Club players